Karl-Heinz Danielowski (born 31 March 1940) is a retired German coxswain. He competed for the United Team of Germany at the 1964 Summer Olympics and for East Germany at the 1968 and 1976 Summer Olympics. In 1964 and 1968 he finished in seventh place in the coxed pairs and eights, respectively, whereas in 1976 he won a gold medal in the eight.

Danielowski also won two European titles, in 1964 and 1973, and a silver at the 1970 World Rowing Championships.

References

External links
 

1940 births
Living people
Coxswains (rowing)
Olympic rowers of the United Team of Germany
Olympic rowers of East Germany
Rowers at the 1964 Summer Olympics
Rowers at the 1968 Summer Olympics
Rowers at the 1976 Summer Olympics
Olympic gold medalists for East Germany
Olympic medalists in rowing
East German male rowers
National People's Army military athletes
World Rowing Championships medalists for East Germany
Medalists at the 1976 Summer Olympics
European Rowing Championships medalists